Eupterote decolorata is a moth in the family Eupterotidae. It was described by Karl Grünberg in 1914. It is found in Assam, India.

References

Moths described in 1914
Eupterotinae